Sätt dig på bocken, or Resan till Pepparkakeland, is a Swedish Christmas song, written by Einar Nerman and published in Morfars visor.

The song is partly known for being sung by a four years old Ingela "Pling" Forsman in Sveriges Radio children's radio program "Barnens brevlåda".

Publication
Lek med toner, 1971 (as "Resan till Pepparkakeland")

Recordings
The song has been recorded, among others, by Solveig Linnér. and Kerstin Andeby's children's choir & Peter Wanngren s orchestra, on the 2005 album Julskivan.

References

Swedish Christmas songs
Swedish-language songs